"I'm Just a Lucky So-and-So" is a 1945 song composed by Duke Ellington, with lyrics written by Mack David.

Notable recordings

Al Hibbler & Duke Ellington - recorded for RCA Victor (catalog No. 20-1799) on November 26, 1945 (Ellington, Hodges, Lawrence brown, soloists) 
Eddie "Lockjaw" Davis & Shirley Scott - The Eddie "Lockjaw" Davis Cookbook Volume 3 (1958).
Billy Eckstine & Quincy Jones on the album At Basin Street East (1961) as part of a Duke Ellington medley.
Annie Ross - included in her album A Gasser! (1960).
Louis Armstrong & Duke Ellington - Together for the First Time (1961)
Ella Fitzgerald - she first recorded it for Decca Records (catalog No. 18814) in New York on Feb 21, 1946. She sang it at Carnegie Hall in 1949 and it was included in "Jazz at the Philharmonic, The Ella Fitzgerald Set"  (Verve/Polygram)" (1949). A later recording was included in Ella Fitzgerald Sings the Duke Ellington Songbook (1958).
Kenny Burrell - Soul Call (1964)
Sarah Vaughan - The Duke Ellington Songbook, Vol. 1 (1979)
Mose Allison - Middle Class White Boy (1982).
Tony Bennett - recorded the song on three occasions, first in 1957 for his album Tony. He included it in his Carnegie Hall concert in 1962 and finally in the album A Tribute to Duke (1977)
Harry "Sweets" Edison & Eddie "Lockjaw" Davis - Jazz at the Philharmonic (1983).
Diana Krall - for her album Stepping Out (1993).
Stacey Kent - included in the album Only Trust Your Heart (2000).

Notes

Songs with music by Duke Ellington
Songs with lyrics by Mack David
1940s jazz standards
1945 songs